The 1980 International cricket season was from May 1980 to August 1980.

Season overview

May

West Indies in England

August

Australia in England

References

1980 in cricket